Gnostic church may refer to a variety of religious organizations which identify themselves with Gnosticism. Various Gnostic religious organizations include:
Ecclesia Gnostica
Ecclesia Gnostica Catholica
Ecclesia Pistis Sophia
Gnostic Church of France
Holy Gnostic Church and Friends
Johannite Church

See also
Gnosticism in modern times
List of Gnostic sects

Gnosticism